The 2019 FIBA 3x3 Europe Cup was the fifth edition of the 3x3 Europe Championships that is organized by FIBA Europe. It was held between 30 August and 1 September at the Kossuth Square in Debrecen, Hungary. The event was held on Kossuth Square in front of the iconic Reformed Great Church.

This 3x3 basketball event featured separate competitions for men's and women's national teams, with Serbia winning the men's bracket and France winning the women's bracket.

References

External links
Official website

2019
2019 in 3x3 basketball
2018–19 in Hungarian basketball
International basketball competitions hosted by Hungary
Sport in Debrecen
FIBA 3x3 Europe Cup
FIBA 3x3 Europe Cup